The Lash is a 1930 American pre-Code Western film produced and distributed by First National Pictures, a subsidiary of Warner Bros. It had an alternate title of Adios. The film was directed by Frank Lloyd and stars Richard Barthelmess,  Mary Astor, James Rennie and Marian Nixon. The film was issued in two formats: Warner Bros. 65mm Vitascope wide screen and regular 35mm. The Vitaphone sound system was used for recording. Exteriors were filmed at the  current Westlake Village, California and Russell Ranch of Thousand Oaks, California areas near  Los Angeles. It was adapted for the screen by Bradley King from a story Adios by Fred Bartlett and Virginia Stivers Bartlett.

Plot

When Francisco Delfino (Richard Barthelmess) goes off to study for four years at a university in Mexico, his home in California is a part of Mexico. By the time he returns (around 1850), however, California in the hands of the United States. He finds his family living in fear and the family estate is in shambles. Although the land deeds granted by the Spanish throne are supposed to be recognized by the U.S. government as proof of ownership, some unscrupulous California land commissioners are attempting to cheat the landowners.

Delfino becomes embroiled in an argument with a Federal official, Peter Harkness (Fred Kohler). When Delfino shows an interest in Rosita (Mary Astor), a girl that Harkness regards as his girlfriend, Delfino is tied up and lashed across the face. He is only saved from further assault by the sheriff, David Howard (James Rennie).

Delfino embarks on a career of Robin Hood-style banditry to avenge the brutal treatment of the Spanish and Mexican settlers, and there is soon a price on his head. Now close friends with Delfino, Howard has fallen in love with his sister, Dolores (Marian Nixon). When their father is shot, Delfino avenges his murder. He delivers the deed to his family's property to Howard, who allows him time to escape to Mexico — where Rosita promises to meet him.

Cast

Richard Barthelmess as Francisco Delfino
Mary Astor as Doña Rosita Garcia
Fred Kohler as Peter Harkness
Marian Nixon as Doña Dolores Delfino
James Rennie as David Howard
Robert Edeson as Don Delfino
Erville Alderson as Judge Travers
Barbara Bedford as Lupe
Arthur Stone as Juan
William L. Thorne as Bella Union cantina landlord
Mathilde Comont as Concha (uncredited)
Xavier Cugat as orchestra leader (uncredited)
Frank Lackteen as caballero (uncredited)
Francis McDonald as caballero (uncredited)

Box Office
According to Warner Bros records the film earned $565,000 domestically and $151,000 foreign.

References

External links

 

av-geek,com Title card for "The Lash"
Magnified Grandeur 
Plot and short review of "The Lash"

1930 films
1930s historical drama films
1930s English-language films
American historical drama films
American Western (genre) films
1930 Western (genre) films
Films about rebels
Films directed by Frank Lloyd
First National Pictures films
Films set in California
Films set in the 1840s
Films set in the 1850s
Films about Mexican Americans
American vigilante films
Warner Bros. films
American black-and-white films
Hispanic and Latino American drama films
1930s American films